Hei Tiki, also known as Primitive Passions and Hei Tiki: A Saga of the Maoris, is a 1935 American mock documentary film made in New Zealand by the eccentric Alexander Markey and released (with sound added) in America. The film gained notoriety in America for having scenes of nudity cut in various states.

Markey directed and produced the film, also writing the screenplay and the "native melodies". His girlfriend Zoe Varney was credited as associate producer. Alfred Hill, the original composer, and Ted Coubray, the original cameraman, were both fired and not credited; Coubray also lost his camera to Markey. The film also used unpaid Māori extras, and taonga, their cherished tribal artefacts, were lent by the cast; Markey took the artefacts when he returned to America, leaving unpaid bills behind him. Local investors had invested £10,000 in the film.

The film was shot in Waihi. The film was released in America with sound added; a symphonic score by Oscar Potoker was added using the RCA Photophone System and "voice-over" narration, which avoided the problems of synchronisation.

It is one of four films (with The Devil's Pit, Down on the Farm, and On the Friendly Road) which claim to be the first "New Zealand talkie", although the claim is dubious in this case as the sound was added in America.

Plot
Mara, the daughter of a chief, is dedicated to the tribal war god and is isolated on the Island of Ghosts on a lake. Manui, a young chief from an enemy tribe, sees her, and the two fall in love. He pretends to be the war god but the ruse is discovered, so her tribe attacks the other tribe. Then Mara persuades both tribes of the benefit of a peaceful alliance through marriage.

Cast 
Ngawaara Kereti as Mara
Ben Biddle as Manui

References
New Zealand Film 1912-1996 by Helen Martin & Sam Edwards p. 46 (1997, Oxford University Press, Auckland)

External links
 
 Adventures in Maoriland: The making of Hei Tiki at NZonScreen (documentary with video extracts)
 Film review of Hei Tikiin New York Times 
  (documentary on Alexander Markley and the Making of Hei Tiki)

1935 films
New Zealand drama films
Films set in New Zealand
1935 drama films
Films shot in New Zealand
American drama films
American black-and-white films
Films about Māori people
1930s English-language films
1930s American films